Calliostoma houarti is a species of sea snail, a marine gastropod mollusk in the family Calliostomatidae.

Some authors place this taxon in the subgenus Calliostoma (Fautor).

Description
The size of the shell varies between 7 mm and 25 mm.

Distribution
This marine species occurs off the Philippines.

References

 Vilvens C. (2000). Description of three new species of Calliostoma from the Philippine Islands. Novapex 1(1) : 3-7

External links
 

houarti
Gastropods described in 2000